Footscray Hospital is a public hospital located on Gordon Street in Footscray, an inner-western suburb of Melbourne, Australia. It is one of three major hospitals operated by Western Health in the western suburbs of Melbourne.

History
Footscray Hospital was opened in 1953 as Footscray and District Hospital, with 213 beds and the first hospital in the state to be fully air-conditioned.  The construction of the hospital came as a result of 32 years of lobbying by the community surrounding the area, with a successful fundraiser to purchase the site occurring in 1921. However, the Charities' Board refused permission to build the hospital three years later in 1924. In the same year, an Outpatients Clinic, Dispensary and Casualty Station was established.

In 1941, the Charities' Board approved the construction of a 30-bed hospital but events of World War II meant construction would not began until later in 1947.

In 1972, the hospital was renamed to Western General and a new Outpatients complex was constructed in 1976.

In 1986, the hospital was amalgamated with Sunshine Hospital to form the Maribyrnong Medical Centre. This name would later be renamed to Western Hospital in 1989.

Throughout the 1990s, the hospital went through a period of expansion with new facilities such as a new emergency department and Community Drug and Alcohol Services unit.

The hospital was renamed to Footscray Hospital in 2014.

Facilities 
The hospital has approximately 290 beds. This includes an emergency department, an intensive care unit, a cardiac care unit, general medicine, surgery, cancer services, adult specialist clinics (outpatients).

Footscray Hospital is part of the Western Clinical School at the Melbourne Medical School alongside Sunshine Hospital.

Performance
Footscray Hospital saw the admission of 8,159 patients from January until March 2018; 5,107 of which were in the emergency department and the remaining 3,487 were same-day patients.

Future
Footscray Hospital has been described as 'run down' or 'past its use-by date' in local media and community. As a result, the Victorian state government announced in its 2017 budget that a new Footscray Hospital will be constructed adjacent to Victoria University, Melbourne which will see more modern facilities and reduce waiting times on the current network. Construction is slated to begin in 2020 and finish by 2025.

References

External links
 

Hospitals in Melbourne
1953 establishments in Australia
Buildings and structures in the City of Maribyrnong
Hospitals established in 1953